The Sigma DP1 was a high-end compact digital camera introduced by the Sigma Corporation. It featured a 14-megapixel Foveon X3 sensor (2652 × 1768 × 3 layers), a fixed 16.6 mm F4.0 lens (28mm equivalent), a  LCD and a pop-up flash. It was the first "compact" camera that featured an APS-C sized sensor, a feature that Sigma claimed would result in DSLR quality images from a small, pocketable camera. 

It was first announced on September 26, 2006, and after several production delays was delivered in the spring of 2008. A follow-up camera, the Sigma DP2, was released in 2009; it features a different lens, and they are being sold in parallel. An improved version called Sigma DP1S was announced on November 17, 2009.

Reviews 
It has been praised for innovation (large sensor in compact body) and class-leading detail at ISO 100 – best image quality in a compact camera, in the same class as DSLRs,
and suited for daylight landscape and architecture photography – but criticized for poor low-light performance and slow speed, summarized as "a great concept that needs a considerable amount of additional work". The user interface has also been criticized.

Specification

Developments 
In February 2012 it was announced by Sigma Corporation that an updated version of both the DP1 and DP2 series, to be known as DP1 Merrill and DP2 Merrill, will incorporate the updated 46 MP Foveon sensor of the SD1, resulting in substantially greater image detail.

Another notable change of the 'Merrill' DP cameras is the focus ring is now in the traditional location around the lens barrel.

Available in March 2013, the Sigma DP3 Merrill has 46MP with 50mm f2.8 (75mm in 35mm film format) and a new Face Detection autofocus.

Software

Sigma Photo Pro 

Post-processing of raw X3F and JPEG of all digital SIGMA cameras

Version 6.x  is a free download for Windows 7+ and Mac OS Version 10.7  (6.3.x). Actual Versions are 6.5.4 (Win 7+) and 6.5.5 (MacOSX 10.9+).

See also
 Sigma DP2
 Sigma SD9
 Sigma SD10
 Sigma SD14
 Sony DSC-R1
 Micro 4/3

References

External links

Sigma Corp. DP1 Special Site (2007).
 Reviews: DPreview; Imaging-Resource   Rytterfalk,   Testieb
 Review of the DP1 camera

DP1